is a sub-kilometer sized asteroid, classified as near-Earth object of the Aten group, approximately 50 meters in diameter. It was first observed on 13 January 1999, by the LINEAR project at Lincoln Laboratory's ETS near Socorro, New Mexico, United States. The asteroid has been the target of a proposed mission.

Orbit 

 orbits the Sun at a distance of 0.8–1.0 AU once every 10 months (318 days). Its orbit has an eccentricity of 0.11 and an inclination of 3° with respect to the ecliptic. The initial orbital elements were determined based on 16 observations made between January 13–15, 1999.

Crewed mission 

NASA has proposed a crewed mission to the object during 2025 or later.  is one of a handful of objects within the acceptable range for the mission and is also one of the largest objects that meets the qualifications. In this proposal, a pair of docked Orion spacecraft would spend 14 days at the object, for a total mission time of 155 days. The astronauts would return samples and help test spacefaring capabilities for a future Mars mission. The crewed mission would be preceded by an unmanned probe to be sent in 2019 at the earliest.

References

External links 
 List of Atens, Minor Planet Center
 
 
 

Minor planet object articles (unnumbered)

19990113